Ramón Mañón Reyes (born January 20, 1968 in Santo Domingo, Dominican Republic) is a former professional baseball pitcher.

After several seasons in their farm system, he was selected by the Rangers in the Rule 5 draft after the 1989 season. After appearing in just one game, the Rangers chose not to keep him, and returned him to the Yankees on April 30, 1990.

Mañón remained in the Yankees organization until the end of the 1992 season, when he became a free agent.

External links

1960 births
Living people
Albany-Colonie Yankees players
Birmingham Barons players
Caimanes del Sur players
Dominican Republic expatriate baseball players in the United States
Fort Lauderdale Yankees players
Gulf Coast Yankees players

Major League Baseball pitchers
Major League Baseball players from the Dominican Republic
Minnesota Skeeters players
People from Santo Domingo
Prince William Yankees players
Prince William Cannons players
Texas Rangers players
Dominican Republic expatriate baseball players in Taiwan
Uni-President Lions players